Sensoria Music & Film Festival is the UK's festival of music, film and digital. The festival based in Sheffield presents a unique mix of live performance, film screenings, installations, exhibitions and music industry activity.  Sensoria’s first edition took place in April 2008 - since then attendances have grown enormously, reaching 12,000 in 2013 with 15,000 expected in 2014. They have welcomed guests including Bill Drummond, Jarvis Cocker, Nitin Sawhney, Richard Hawley, Mark Kermode, Mary Anne Hobbs, British Sea Power, Julien Temple, Laurie Anderson, James Dean Bradfield and more. The festival is renowned for its eclectic programme celebrating mavericks and pioneers, its use of unusual venues and for finding new ways of presenting, some examples include: drive in cinema's, a screening in an outdoor pool in Hathersage and gigs in disused department stores.
 
Sensoria also runs the SensoriaPro Industry Day - an informal meeting point for professionals in music and film that has attracted multiple award-winning professionals from all over the world.

2018's edition welcomed Sensoria's most expansive programme to date, including BEAK> the side-project of Portishead's Geoff Barrow, a Wes Anderson film weekend and the return of the 3 Ring Circus with Richard Hawley, Chris Difford and Graham Fellows.

Festival patrons 
 Nitin Sawhney
 Julien Temple
 Martyn Ware

Festival guests 
 Jarvis Cocker
 Mark Kermode
 Bill Drummond
 Mary Anne Hobbs
 Julien Temple
 Richard Hawley
 Feargal Sharkey
 Rob da Bank
 Laurie Anderson
 Geoff Barrow
 Chris Packham
 James Dean Bradfield

Year-round activity 
Sensoria hosts regular events throughout the year. These have included; 
•	Screenings at In the City, Manchester
•	Resonator - educational music workshops.
•	Jail Guitar Doors film tour with Billy Bragg
•	Music Business Support Events
•	Devised and delivered Festivals Unit of the Creative Media Diplomas.

References

External links 
 Sensoria Music & Film Festival
 Uncommon People

Music festivals in South Yorkshire
Film festivals in England
Music in Sheffield
Events in Sheffield